The presidency of Bosnia and Herzegovina is a three-member body which collectively serves as head of state of Bosnia and Herzegovina. According to Article V of the Constitution of Bosnia and Herzegovina, the presidency comprises three members: one Bosniak, one Serb, and one Croat. The Bosniak and Croat members are elected from a joint constituency in the Federation of Bosnia and Herzegovina, whilst the Serb member is elected from voters in Republika Srpska.

The three members elected at any one election serve a collective four-year term. Individuals are able to serve no more than two consecutive four-year terms, although there are no overall term limits.

Although the unsubdivided body is the collective head of state, one member is designated as chairperson. The position of chairperson rotates twice around the three members every eight months, with the candidate receiving the most votes overall becoming the first chairperson over the four-year term.

Current members

Powers, duties and responsibilities

The Presidency is responsible for:
Conducting the foreign policy of Bosnia and Herzegovina;
Appointing ambassadors and other international representatives, no more than two-thirds of which may come from the Federation;
Representing Bosnia and Herzegovina in European and international organizations and institutions and seeking membership in such organizations and institutions of which it is not a member;
Negotiating, denouncing, and, with the consent of the Parliamentary Assembly, ratifying treaties of Bosnia and Herzegovina;
Executing decisions of the Parliamentary Assembly;
Proposing, upon the recommendation of the Council of Ministers, an annual budget to the Parliamentary Assembly;
Reporting as requested, but no less than annually, to the Parliamentary Assembly on expenditures by the Presidency;
Coordinating as necessary with international and nongovernmental organizations in Bosnia and Herzegovina, and;
Performing such other functions as may be necessary to carry out its duties, as may be assigned to it by the Parliamentary Assembly, or as may be agreed by the Entities.

List of members

See also

Chairman of the Presidency of Bosnia and Herzegovina
List of members of the Presidency of Bosnia and Herzegovina
List of members of the Presidency by time in office
Triumvirate

References

Notes

External links
Website of the Presidency
Article V of the Constitution of Bosnia and Herzegovina
Holding Bosnian presidents accountable, ISN Security Watch, 21 December 2006

1996 establishments in Bosnia and Herzegovina
 
Presidencies
Politics of Bosnia and Herzegovina
Government of Bosnia and Herzegovina
Collective heads of state